Kapla is a village in the Municipality of Tabor in central Slovenia. The Slovenian A1 motorway runs along the northern edge of the territory belonging to the village. The area is part of the traditional region of Styria. The municipality is now included in the Savinja Statistical Region.

Church

The local church is dedicated to Saint Radegund and belongs to the Parish of Sveti Jurij ob Taboru. It has a Gothic core with major 19th-century rebuilding and a belfry dating to 1669.

References

External links

Kapla at Geopedia

Populated places in the Municipality of Tabor